New Police Story is a 2004 Hong Kong action film produced and directed by Benny Chan, and also produced by and starring Jackie Chan. The film was released in the Hong Kong on 24 September 2004. The film is a reboot of the Police Story series and is the fifth installment of the series. New Police Story relies much more on drama and heavy action than its predecessors.

Plot

Five youths rob a bank with the intention of shooting police officers. Inspector Chan Kwok-wing and his squad chase the gang and the entire squad is wiped out, including Hong, the younger brother of Chan's girlfriend Ho Yee. Sole survivor Chan takes a year long leave to binge-drink until his new partner Frank Cheng tries to convince Chan to return and reopen the case.

Chan initially refuses, but changes his mind after apprehending two youths who robbed him while he was drunk. Chan's superior Chiu Chan, believing Chan's overconfidence was responsible for the disastrous raid, challenges them to solve the case before he does. Frank reveals to Chan he is kin of a deceased squad member. Former colleague Sam Wong reveals a clue from the first robbery, a watch he snatched from a robber. Wong says one of the gang is a woman and that they like to play X-games.

Chan and Frank are tailed by Chiu and the police at an upcoming X-Games event. Sam has been arrested to assist in the investigation. At the skyscraper rooftop event, Frank and Chan locate gang member Fire, while Sam and the police find the woman robber Sue. Fire fatally wounds Sam and escapes with Sue. Sam confesses he was blackmailed by the gang so they could ambush Chan's team. Chan and Frank chase Sue and Fire down the building on a tightrope.

Fire shoots a bus driver forcing Chan and Frank to break off the chase to save the bus. Chan's superior, Superintendent Tai reveals that he never assigned a partner to Chan. Chan confronts Frank, who admits  he failed the exam to be a cop; he is neither a cop nor a kin of deceased squad member. Chan is convinced that Frank is sincere, and the two are briefed by Frank's friend, Constable Sa Sa, that the gang members come from rich families and their leader Joe is the son of the Deputy Commissioner of Police. The gang created online video games based on their raids.

At the gang's new hideout Joe kills Sue, who was critically wounded during the chase. The gang plants a bomb on Ho Yee and send her to the police station. The blast knocks Ho Yee into a coma. Frank's false identity is revealed and he and Chan are arrested. The gang taunts them about their next target. Frank and Chan are unofficially released to apprehend the gang.

Through the online game, Chan, Frank and Sa Sa learn that the gang's next target is the Bank of Hong Kong. To avoid another botched raid, Chan has the public removed from the building, and brings in the gang members' parents. Joe kills gang member Max for surrendering. Frank injures Fire before retreating from Joe's shooting. Chan has hand-to-hand combat with Tin Tin before Tin Tin is shot by Joe's friendly fire. Chan follows Joe to the roof, where Joe threatens to throw Frank to his death. Joe challenges Chan to a race to assemble a semi-automatic pistol, which Chan wins by loading the bullet directly into the chamber.

The police arrive on the roof along with Joe's father. Chan attempts to pursue Joe into surrendering; Joe admits defeat, but aims his empty gun at Chan, choosing suicide by cop. Chan rushes to rescue Frank, and both of them fall from the building onto a fireman's inflated cushion. Joe's father resigns. In the hospital, Ho Yee has recovered and accepts Chan's marriage proposal. Frank is arrested for assumption of authority. Chan remembers comforting the orphan Frank as a child after Frank's father was killed by a truck while trying to steal food, prompting Frank to become a policeman and repay Chan.

Cast 

 Jackie Chan as Chief Inspector Chan Kwok-wing
 Nicholas Tse as Frank Cheng Siu-fung
 Charlie Yeung as Sun Ho-yee
 Charlene Choi as Sa Sa, Constable
 Daniel Wu as Joe Kwan
 Dave Wong as Sam Wong Sum
 Andy On as Law Tin-tin
 Terence Yin as Fire
 Hayama Go as Max Leung
 Coco Chiang as Sue Chow
 Yu Rongguang as Chief Inspector Chiu Chan
 Chun Sun as Joe Kwan's father & Deputy Commissioner of Police
 Lui Yau-wai as Joe Kwan's mother (as Lisa Lui)
 Lee Ting-fung – Joe Kwan at Age 6
 Lam Chi-Tai (2) as Thieves' lawyer
 Lee Tin-Cheung as Thieves' lawyer
 Lee Ji-Kei as Max's father
 Luk Mei-Ling as Max's mother
 Brenda Chan Kwai-Fan as Thieves' parent
 Ken Ling Hiu-Wa as Thieves' parent
 Wu Bai as Father of Frank Cheng
 Lau Ho-Chun as Frank Cheng (aged 8)
 Liu Kai-chi as Superintendent Tai
 John Shum as Eric Chow
 Ken Lo as Kwong, Wing's team member
 Asuka Higuchi as Kwong's wife
 Steven Cheung as Green-haired thief
 Kenny Kwan as Red-haired thief
 Deep Ng as Hong, Wing's team member
 Tony Ho as Chui, Wing's team member
 Timmy Hung as Tin-ming, Wing's team member
 Sammy Hung as Tin-chiu, Wing's team member
 Carl Ng as Carl, Wing's team member
 Andrew Lin as Hoi, Wing's team member
 Samuel Pang as Sam, Wing's team member
 Philip Ng as Philip, Wing's team member
 Winnie Leung as Female Hostage
 Eric Kwok as Male Hostage
 Mandy Chiang as Chui's girlfriend
 Mak Bau as Negotiator
 Ringo Chen as Tourist
 Park Huyn-jin as Disco Bouncer
 Ng Kong as Disco Bouncer
 He Jun as Disco Bouncer
 Anthony Carpio as Disco Bouncer
 Chan Tat-kwong as Disco Bouncer
 Stephen Rohn as X-Game Player
 Stephen Julien as X-Game Player
 Ho Wai-yip as Police Officer Outside Convenience Store
 Audiotraffic – Jazz Bar Band
 Victy Wong as Cop
 Zac Koo as HKCEC Police man
 Stephen Bohn as X-Game Player
 Mars (extra) (uncredited)
 Roderick Lam as Sam's subordinate
 Jason Yip as Student's father
 Nic Yan as Detention Suspect

Jackie Chan stunt team
 Bradley James Allan
 Paul Andreovski
 Nicky Li
 Ken Lo
 Mars
 Wu Gang
 Park Hyun-jin
 He Jun
 Lee In-seob
 Han Kwan-hua

Production
Principal photography took place in Hong Kong between 1 January and 31 December 2003.

Box office 
New Police Story opened in Hong Kong on 23 September 2004 where it made HK$5,625,746 in its first three days. It ended its run with HK$21 million to making it the fourth highest-grossing domestic release of the year.

The film received a limiting release in the United Kingdom on 13 October 2006. In its opening weekend the film grossed $19,332 having been shown in 16 theatres. It ranked #21 at the box office and averaged $1,208 per theatre. As of 22 October 2006, New Police Story had grossed a total of $33,404 in its two-week release in the UK. British television host and film critic Jonathan Ross gave the film a fairly positive review and felt that Chan could "still do the business".

International version 
New Police Story was released straight-to-DVD in the United States by Lionsgate on 16 May 2006. The DVD included an English dubbed with participation by Jackie Chan. Also included is an introduction by Jackie himself and a message not to buy an unlicensed copy of the film. When played in its original language it contains dubtitles. A cut was made towards the end of the film wherein a young Frank Cheng was being escorted back to the PRC by Chan.

A Blu-ray version was released in the United States on 24 November 2009.

Awards and nominations

See also 
 Crime Story
 The Protector
 SPL: Sha Po Lang
 List of Hong Kong films
 Jackie Chan filmography

References

External links 
 
 
 
 HK Action Films review of New Police Story
 Official UK Site for New Police Story

2004 action films
2000s police procedural films
2004 films
2004 martial arts films
Cantonese-language films
Films about bank robbery
Films about child abuse
Films about domestic violence
Films directed by Benny Chan
Films set in Hong Kong
Films with screenplays by Alan Yuen
Hong Kong action films
Hong Kong martial arts films
Police Story (film series)
Police detective films
Reboot films
Hong Kong crime films
Hong Kong crime action films
2000s Hong Kong films